Jamil Jan Kochai (born 1992) is an Afghan writer who was born in Peshawar, Pakistan and resides in Sacramento, California. He is a O. Henry Award winner with two published books of fiction.

Early life and education 
Kochai was born in Pakistan and brought to the United States as a baby and was raised in California. His first language is Pashto and his family also speaks Farsi. After 9/11, he was bullied, and at 12, his family traveled to Afghanistan, which served as inspiration for his first book.

While growing up in West Sacramento, California, a teacher at River City High School encouraged him to take a creative writing class, leading him into fiction, then he continued to write as he worked toward a bachelor's degree at California State University, Sacramento, majoring in English. He then received two master's degrees in creative writing, first from University of California, Davis in 2017 and then from the Iowa Writers' Workshop in 2019, where he was a Truman Capote Fellow.

Career 
His first book, a novel titled 99 Nights in Logar, was published by Viking Press in 2019 and was a finalist for the 2020 PEN/Hemingway Award for Debut Novel and shortlisted for the 2019 DSC Prize for South Asian Literature. The debut won the John C. Zacharis First Book Award from Ploughshares. It was reviewed as "funny" and "razor-sharp" with a "singular, resonant voice" by Dina Nayeri in The New York Times Book Review and called it "charming and unpredictable" by The Guardian, as well as "phenomenal" by Mohammed Hanif. It was named a book to read by BuzzFeed, Time, The New Yorker, and New York, and Harper's Magazine wrote that the "funny" and "surreal" book is "driven by a profusion of tales within tales."

Kochai stated that Islamic texts and literature were an important influence on the book. It borrowed from the structure of The Arabian Nights. A part of the book is in Pashto without translation, which he said was because he "wanted to upset this notion that, in order for this story to have value, it needed to be made consumable for an English readership."

In 2022, Kochai published a short story collection, his second book, called The Haunting of Hajji Hotak and Other Stories from Penguin Random House. It was characterised by one reviewer as "a masterful collection underpinned by an understanding of the lack of distinction between the personal and political". In an interview with The New Yorker, he stated that the title story, published in the magazine after being inspired by a headline from The Onion, represents many themes in the collection. In an earlier interview with The New Yorker, Kochai discussed writing a story based on a video game set in Afghanistan called Metal Gear Solid V: The Phantom Pain.

His stories have been published in Ploughshares, A Public Space, and The Sewanee Review.

References 

1992 births
Living people
21st-century American novelists
Afghan novelists
Afghan writers
American short story writers
Asian writers
Iowa Writers' Workshop alumni
The New Yorker people
Pakistani emigrants to the United States
University of California, Davis alumni